Alexander Horowitz (born January 1991), is a British composer and pianist. He studied at the Royal Conservatoire of Scotland and the Glasgow School of Art. Horowitz received a BAFTA New Talent nomination in 2011. In 2013, Horowitz created the score for the Scottish short film, The Groundsman, starring David O'Hara. The same year, Horowitz created a score for the theatre show Toi Toi Toi. Horowitz's score blended themes from Mozart, Rossini, and Giuseppe Verdi with his original compositions.

In 2020, Horowitz accompanied the harpist Heidi Krutzen for a performance of Alexander Scriabin's Etude.

He is the audio director at Improbable in London, and was previously head of audio at the games division of The Imaginarium in London, and the audio lead at Studio Gobo in Hove, which produced Hogwarts Legacy. Horowitz's score incorporated some motifs from John Williams' original Harry Potter score with subdued whimsical pieces that accompanied the player's journey around the role-playing video game's open world. His works The Room of Hidden Things and A Focused Mind appear on the Hogwarts Legacy album Study Themes from the Original Video Game Soundtrack.

Selected works
He has created film and theatre scores and worked on video game music for Avalanche Software, EA Tiburon, Rockstar Games and Warner Bros.

References

External links
IMDb profile

Living people
1991 births
British male pianists
Alumni of the Glasgow School of Art
Alumni of the Royal Conservatoire of Scotland
Video game developers
Video game composers
British male film score composers